The 2022 ACT Clay Court International 1 was a professional tennis tournament played on outdoor clay courts. It was the seventh edition of the tournament which was part of the 2022 ITF Women's World Tennis Tour. It took place in Canberra, Australia between 21 and 27 March 2022.

Singles main draw entrants

Seeds

 1 Rankings are as of 7 March 2022.

Other entrants
The following players received wildcards into the singles main draw:
  Destanee Aiava
  Kimberly Birrell
  Alexandra Bozovic
  Abbie Myers

The following player received entry using a protected ranking:
  Pranjala Yadlapalli

The following players received entry from the qualifying draw:
  Shiho Akita
  Rutuja Bhosale
  Nagi Hanatani
  Merel Hoedt
  Hiroko Kuwata
  Akiko Omae
  Erika Sema
  Olivia Tjandramulia

Champions

Singles

  Moyuka Uchijima def.  Olivia Gadecki, 6–2, 6–2

Doubles

  Han Na-lae /  Jang Su-jeong def.  Yuki Naito /  Moyuka Uchijima, 3–6, 6–2, [10–5]

References

External links
 2022 ACT Clay Court International 1 at ITFtennis.com
 Official website

2022 ITF Women's World Tennis Tour
2022 in Australian tennis
March 2022 sports events in Australia
Sports competitions in Canberra
Tennis in the Australian Capital Territory